Makkaur Lighthouse is a coastal lighthouse located on the northern coast of the Varanger Peninsula in Båtsfjord Municipality, Troms og Finnmark county, Norway.

History
The lighthouse was established in 1928, destroyed during World War II, and later rebuilt. The lighthouse was listed as a protected site in 1998.

The light is turned on from 12 August until 24 April each year, but it is off during the summer due to the midnight sun. There was an active foghorn operating at the site from 1922 until 1989. The site is only accessible by boat. The lighthouse was automated in 2005.

See also

Lighthouses in Norway
List of lighthouses in Norway

References

External links
 Norsk Fyrhistorisk Forening 

Båtsfjord
Lighthouses completed in 1928
Lighthouses in Troms og Finnmark
Listed lighthouses in Norway